"Dreamy Eyes" is a song written and sung by Johnny Tillotson, which he recorded on August 21, 1958, and released later that year. The song was Tillotson’s debut single. "Dreamy Eyes" spent 9 weeks on the Billboard Hot 100 chart, peaking at No. 63.

The song was re-released in 1961, and reached No. 35 on the Billboard Hot 100 chart, spending an additional 14 weeks on the chart, making it a total of 23 weeks the song spent on the Billboard Hot 100.  In January 1962, the song reached No. 14 on Canada's CHUM Hit Parade.

References

1958 songs
Johnny Tillotson songs
Songs written by Johnny Tillotson
Cadence Records singles
1958 debut singles